The 1991 Tour de France was the 78th edition of Tour de France, one of cycling's Grand Tours. The Tour began in Lyon with a prologue individual time trial on 6 July and Stage 11 occurred on 16 July with a flat stage to Saint-Herblain. The race finished on the Champs-Élysées in Paris on 28 July.

Prologue
6 July 1991 — Lyon,  (ITT)

Stage 1
7 July 1991 — Lyon to Lyon,

Stage 2
7 July 1991 — Bron to Chassieu,  (TTT)

Stage 3
6 July 1991 — Villeurbanne to Dijon,

Stage 4
7 July 1991 — Dijon to Reims,

Stage 5
8 July 1991 — Reims to Valenciennes,

Stage 6
9 July 1991 — Arras to Le Havre,

Stage 7
10 July 1991 — Le Havre to Argentan,

Stage 8
11 July 1991 — Argentan to Alençon,  (ITT)

Stage 9
13 July 1991 — Alençon to Rennes,

Stage 10
14 July 1991 — Rennes to Quimper,

Stage 11
14 July 1991 — Quimper to Saint-Herblain,

References

1991 Tour de France
Tour de France stages